Baroque is an album by the jazz pianist Junko Onishi, recorded and released in 2010.

Reception

Matt Collar of Allmusic says, "Baroque features several Onishi originals as well as her unique interpretations of some 20th century classical pieces, including 'The Three Penny Opera.'"

Track listing

Personnel 
 Junko Onishi - piano
 Nicholas Payton - trumpet
 Wycliffe Gordon - trombone
 James Carter - Tenor sax, alto sax, bass clarinet, flute
 Reginald Veal - bass (on 1-3, 5-7)
 Rodney Whitaker - bass (on 1, 3, 5, 7)
 Herlin Riley - drums
 Roland Guerrero - congas

Production 
 Producer - Junko Onishi, Kuninori Tamamori
 Executive producer - Kimitaka Kato, Kazutoshi Chiba, Hiroko Kawachi
 Recording and mixing engineer - Jim Anderson
 Assistant engineer - Ted Tuthill
 Mastering engineer - Alan Silverman
 Photographer - Mika Ninagawa
 Art direction - Takuya Yamada
 Stylist - Takuto Satoyama
 Coordination - Kayoko "Coco" Seo, Kiyoko Murata
 Management - Kuninori Tamamori, Nao Sekine
 A&R - Yoshihisa Saito

Release history

References

External links
 
 All about Jazz review By KEITH HENRY BROWN 
 

2010 albums
Junko Onishi albums